Miklós Malek may refer to

Miklós Malek (composer) (born 1945), Hungarian classical composer, arranger and musician 
Miklós Malek (musician), aka Miklós Malek Jr., (born 1975), Hungarian pop music songwriter, producer, artist and television personality, son of composer Miklós Malek above